Maxime Georges Alexandre Plennevaux (born 14 June 1993) is a Belgian field hockey player who plays as a forward for Orée.

Club career
Plennevaux started playing hockey at Waterloo Ducks who he left for Royal Léopold when he was 17 years old. He left Léopold in 2017 for Real Club de Polo in the Spanish División de Honor. In the 2018–19 season he played for HGC in the Dutch Hoofdklasse. In 2019 he returned to Léopold. After three seasons at Léopold he left them for another Brussels club Royal Orée.

International career
In 2013, Plennevaux was a member of the Belgium under-21 side at the FIH Junior World Cup in New Delhi, India. He followed this up with an appearance in 2014 at the EuroHockey Junior Championship in Waterloo, Belgium. He debuted for the Red Lions in 2014 in a test match against the Netherlands in Uccle. His first major tournament with the national team was the inaugural tournament of the FIH Pro League, where he won a silver medal.

References

External links

Belgian male field hockey players
1993 births
Living people
Male field hockey forwards
Waterloo Ducks H.C. players
Men's Belgian Hockey League players
Real Club de Polo de Barcelona players
División de Honor de Hockey Hierba players
HGC players
Men's Hoofdklasse Hockey players
Place of birth missing (living people)
Royal Léopold Club players

2018 FIH Indoor Hockey World Cup players